The North–South Line (NSL) is a high-capacity Mass Rapid Transit (MRT) line in Singapore, operated by SMRT Corporation. It runs from Jurong East station, located in Western Singapore, to Marina South Pier station in the Central Area, via Woodlands station in northern Singapore. The line operates for almost 20 hours a day (from the first departure 5:07 am to approximately 1 am the next day), with headways of up to 1 to 2 minutes during peak hours and 5 to 8 minutes during off-peak hours. All the trains on the North-South Line run with a six-car formation.

It was the first MRT line to be built in Singapore, with the first section from Yio Chu Kang station to Toa Payoh station beginning service on 7 November 1987, followed by an extension southwards to Raffles Place station on 12 December the same year and northwards to Yishun station on 20 December 1988. After the southern extension to Marina Bay station opened on 4 November 1989, the North-South Line was formed and split from the East West line. In the 1990s, the line extended to the north and west connecting to the Branch line via Woodlands through the Woodlands line extension.

Since the 2010s, due to the ageing infrastructure of the North-South Line (being the oldest and heavily utilised MRT line), significant improvements have been made on this line, such as the replacement of sleepers, third rail replacement and the introduction of new rolling stocks (the C151B and the C151C) to replace the older rolling stocks and increase passenger capacity. The North-South Line is also the first line to have undergone a major re-signalling project, converting it from semi-automatic to fully automated operations in 2019. Other recent developments of the line include a new extension to Marina South Pier station on 23 November 2014 and a new infill station, Canberra station, on 2 November 2019. Two more infill stations (Brickland and Sungei Kadut stations) on the line are being planned and are set to be opened in the 2030s.

History

Initial developments

The Mass Rapid Transit (MRT) originated from a forecast in 1967 by the planners of the State and City Planning Project, which stated the need for a rail-based urban transport system in Singapore by 1992. Following a debate on whether a bus-only system would be more cost-effective, then-Minister for Communications Ong Teng Cheong came to the conclusion that an all-bus system would be inadequate, as it would have to compete for road space in the land-scarce country.

After deciding on a rail-based system, the construction of Phase I of the MRT system, which will be the North-South Line, was given priority as the line passes through areas having a higher demand for public transport, such as the densely populated housing estates of Toa Payoh and Ang Mo Kio and the Central Area. The line was expected to relieve the traffic congestion on the Thomson–Sembawang road corridor.  Construction of the MRT line (and also the MRT system itself) started on 22 October 1983, and the first section from Yio Chu Kang station to Toa Payoh station opened on 7 November 1987. At the inauguration ceremony, Ong Teng Cheong, who backed and commissioned the planning of the MRT system, attended the ceremony as a special Guest of Honour. Dr Yeo Ning Hong, the Minister For Communications and Information, inaugurated the start of MRT operations and announced it to be the "beginning" of the MRT system.

Nine more stations from Novena station to Outram Park station via Raffles Place opened on 12 December that year. The line was extended northward to Yishun station on 20 December 1988 as part of phase 2B and it began independent operations on 4 November 1989 as the North-South Line when the extension to Marina Bay station was opened.

Woodlands extension

After the Branch line (from the Jurong East to Choa Chu Kang stations) opened in 1990, the Woodlands MRT line was envisioned so as to close the gap between Yishun and Choa Chu Kang stations. Numerous changes were made to the number of stations for the extension mainly to accommodate the 1991 Concept Plan by the Urban Redevelopment Authority, which aimed to make Woodlands a regional centre for northern Singapore.

During the initial planning of the line, Sembawang station was only intended as a provisional station, to be built at a later date due to the underdevelopment of Sembawang, and construction began on 19 November 1992. Sembawang station and Kranji station were later included in the construction after the second round of planning (construction began at the same time on 19 November 1992) and Sungei Kadut station was then omitted. Sungei Kadut will be built later if the town's population justifies the necessity for the station.

During the construction, a total of 19 new trains were purchased for almost S$259 million for the new MRT line, designed by German company Siemens Aktiengesellschaft, to complement the 66 first-generation C151 trains. There was also a need to level the land covered in thick vegetation in Kadut, Woodlands and Sembawang for the MRT line.

With the official opening of the Woodlands extension on 10 February 1996 by then Prime Minister Goh Chok Tong, the Branch line was incorporated into the North-South Line. The extension was built at a cost of $1.2 billion.

Subsequent developments

The NSL platforms of the Bishan station underwent major alterations to increase the passenger capacity of the station from 1,250 to 2,020. A new air-conditioned platform to serve southbound trains to Marina South Pier was constructed and opened for service on 27 July 2008, connected to Junction 8 via Exit E. The station was expanded to handle increased passenger traffic when the CCL station opens. As the original platform, now serving northbound trains to Jurong East, remained in service, upgrading works for the platform (Platform A) was hindered and took about a year to complete. While the re-tiling of the platform was done during the day, the Platform Screen Doors (PSDs) were installed in sections through the night. An air-conditioning system was also installed as part of the upgrade. Upgrading works for the platform were fully completed on 23 May 2009.

Under the Land Transport Master Plan 2008, the Jurong East Modification Project entailed the construction of a new platform and the addition of a fourth track to Jurong East station to reduce waiting times and crowding at the station during peak hours. The modification project was completed on 27 May 2011. The track and platform was initially opened during morning peak hours only, but since December 2011, they also operate during the evening peak hours.

In the 2008 Land Transport Master Plan, the  North–South Line extension was announced as one of the upcoming projects rolled out by the Land Transport Authority to expand Singapore's rail network. The one kilometre extension from Marina Bay to Marina South Pier station was opened on 23 November 2014. This extension serves the Marina South Pier, the Marina Bay Cruise Centre Singapore, and future developments in the Marina Bay Downtown area.

On 17 January 2013, the Land Transport Authority (LTA) announced that a feasibility study was conducted to construct Canberra MRT station. The feasibility study was completed in 2014 and LTA announced Canberra as a new station. Construction of Canberra station commenced on 26 March 2016. The station, which is an infill station with side platforms, was built along an operational section of the line between Sembawang and Yishun. The station cost S$90 million to build, and is meant to serve upcoming developments at the vicinity. Canberra station opened on 2 November 2019.

Incidents
On 3 March 2003, a 23-year-old man lost control of his vehicle along Lentor Avenue, crashed through the fence, and landed on a stretch of track between Yio Chu Kang and Khatib stations. The incident forced a train carrying hundreds of commuters to come to a screeching halt, but not before flattening the front of the car. The accident disrupted train services for more than three hours and cost SMRT between S$100,000 and $150,000 in damages and lost revenue.

On 15 December 2011, train services between Bishan and Marina Bay stations were disrupted due to damage sustained on the power rail between City Hall and Dhoby Ghaut. Trains along this stretch were stalled and caused a service disruption until 11:40pm on that day. Two days later, a similar problem caused a seven-hour disruption between Ang Mo Kio and Marina Bay. According to SMRT, the disruption was caused by damage to the third rail and the trains' collector shoes. Seven trains were damaged in this incident. These two service disruptions on the North–South line were both related to damaged rail, and became one of the worst disruption since SMRT's inception in 1987.

On 7 July 2015, train services on the North-South and East-West lines were temporarily disrupted due to massive power trips detected along both lines. A cause of the disruption was due to damaged insulators which caused a failure to properly supply power. For this disruption that brought inconvenience to 413,000 commuters, LTA imposed a 'record' fine of S$5.4 million on SMRT.

On 7 October 2017, a 20-hour long disruption of services started due to flooding in the tunnels between Braddell station and Bishan station due to a faulty drainage system, resulting in disruption of train services between Ang Mo Kio and Marina South Pier stations in both directions for several hours. A trackside fire between Raffles Place and Marina Bay stations further exacerbated the disruption. Train services between Marina South Pier and Newton resumed at about 9:20pm on the same day, followed by Newton and Ang Mo Kio at around 2pm the following day. Although no injuries or casualties were reported, SMRT fired a total of eight employees from the maintenance crew, and incurred a S$2 million fine, following the incident.

On 14 October 2020, train services from Jurong East to Woodlands stations were disrupted for more than three and a half hours, owing to a faulty power cable, which affected the East West Line and Circle Line too. The power fault began at 7pm and by 7:30pm, commuters were stuck in the trains. Free bus bridging services were activated at all affected stations, and bus operators increased the frequency of regular services serving these areas. Service resumed at all stations along the North–South and East-West Lines at 10:35pm. A total of 36 stations were affected by the power fault. The incident led to a replacement of 150km of power cables for the Tuas West Extension and two SMRT staff being suspended.

Future plans

In the Land Transport Master Plan 2040 (LTMP2040), two new infill stations are projected to be built along the existing North-South Line. Brickland station will be built between Bukit Gombak and Choa Chu Kang stations, while Sungei Kadut station will be built between Yew Tee and Kranji stations and provide an additional interchange with the Downtown Line. Both stations are expected to be completed before mid-2030s.

Network and operations

Services
Train services on the North-South Line operates from approximately 5:30am to around midnight daily. In general, during peak hours, train frequency is 2 to 3 minutes while during non-peak hours the frequency is reduced to 5 minutes throughout the entire route. Each day, the first train begins service at approximately 5:07am daily from Ang Mo Kio station to Yishun station, 5:15am (5:35am on Sundays and public holidays) from Jurong East station to Marina South Pier station. From Marina South Pier station, the first train going to Jurong East station begins service at 6:10am (approximately 6:40am on Sundays and public holidays). In the 11pm onwards, selected trains from Jurong East station will terminate at either Ang Mo Kio or Toa Payoh stations or Yew Tee station  Selected trains departing from Marina South Pier station will also terminate at Kranji station in the late evenings.

Train services on the North-South Line are also subjected to maintenance and renewal works, usually on selected Fridays & Saturdays. Shuttle bus services may be provided throughout the duration of the early closures and late openings for affected commuters. Operations of the North-South Line are affected by the COVID-19 pandemic, leading to the drop of ridership.

Route

The North–South line forms an incomplete loop from Jurong East in the West Region of Singapore, north to Woodlands and Sembawang, and south to the Central Area. The line begins above ground at Jurong East station from where it continues north on a set of elevated viaducts, with the exception of a short tunnel between the Bukit Batok and Bukit Gombak stations, and a surface section of track between the Bukit Gombak and Choa Chu Kang stations. The line curves from the Yew Tee to Kranji stations and continues eastwards, paralleling Woodlands Avenue 3 (which the line briefly cuts underneath between Kranji and Marsiling stations) and Avenue 7 main roads.

After Sembawang station, the line follows the route of Canberra Link and Yishun Avenue 2, curving southwards. Between Khatib and Yio Chu Kang stations parallel to Lentor Avenue, the line continues at surface level; this section is the longest distance between any two MRT stations in Singapore. The line continues above ground for the Yio Chu Kang and Ang Mo Kio stations, then it goes back to surface level for Bishan station, the MRT system's only at-grade station. A branch line to Bishan Depot exists between the Ang Mo Kio and Bishan stations. After Bishan, the line goes underground through the Central Area. The North-South Line runs parallel to the East West line at the City Hall and Raffles Place stations, which are also cross-platform interchanges to the East West line. The line terminates at Marina South Pier.

Stations
The line serves 27 stations across  of track, and station codes for the line are red, corresponding to the line's colour on the system map. 11 stations, from Braddell to Marina South Pier are underground, with the rest being ground-level or elevated. With the exception of Bishan, Braddell and Canberra stations, the other stations have island platforms.

Legend

List

Depots

Infrastructure

Rolling stock

Electric Multiple Unit (EMU) trains on the North–South Line operate in a six-car formation, based out of Bishan Depot and Ulu Pandan Depot, which provides train maintenance, inspection and overhaul facilities. Similar rolling stock is used on the East-West Line, with an electrification of 750 V DC powered by a third rail. With the exception of the C651 trains, the current rolling stock was manufactured by Kawasaki Heavy Industries, in a joint venture with CRRC Qingdao Sifang for the subsequent rolling stocks of the C151A, C151B and C151C trains. When the initial line opened, the rolling stock of the North-South Line consisted of 66 first-generation C151 trains only. The 19 second-generation C651 trains was introduced during the Woodlands extension to complement the existing 66 first-generation C151 trains. The 21 third-generation C751B trains was introduced during the Changi Airport extension to complement the existing 66 first-generation C151 trains and 19 second-generation C651 trains. In 2011, the fourth-generation C151A was introduced, increasing the passenger capacity of both the North-South and East-West lines by 15%. The C151A trains was the first successful joint venture between Kawasaki Heavy Industries and CSR Qingdao Sifang in the international market.

As part of efforts to further increase passenger capacity on the line, newer C151B and C151C trains was subsequently delivered in 2017 and 2018 respectively. The introduction of the C151B trains saw the introduction of STARiS 2.0, which is also seen in subsequent rolling stocks. The C151C trains is also the first MRT rolling stock on the NSEWL to be fitted with tip-up seats, in addition to the current features of the C151B trains.

Another generation of rolling stock, the R151 trains, will be delivered from 2022 to 2026, to replace all 66 first-generation C151, all 19 second-generation C651 and all 21 third-generation C751B trains which will be retired. The R151 trains will be the first rolling stock on the North-South Line to be manufactured by Bombardier (Bought by Alstom in 2021), which has also supplied trains for the Downtown Line.

Signalling
Initially, the North–South line used a semi-automatic signalling system consisting of the Westinghouse fixed block signalling system with automatic train control under automatic train operation GoA 2. However, the ageing system had undermined the rail reliability on the line, requiring the NSL to upgrade its signalling system. Since 2019, the North-South Line is fully equipped with Thales SelTrac Communications-based train control moving block signalling system with automatic train control under automatic train operation (ATO) GoA 3 (DTO). The subsystems consist of automatic train protection to govern train speed, NetTrac MT Automatic Train Supervision (ATS) to track and schedule trains and a Computer-based interlocking system that prevents incorrect signal and track points to be set.

A new moving-block signalling system, supplied by Thales, replaced the ageing fixed-block signalling system on the North-South Line. The upgrading works were completed in phases from 2016. With the upgraded signalling system, trains are now able to run closer to each other. The new system was tested on the evening of 28 March 2017. Train services were paused for ten minutes as the old signalling system was being changed to the new system. From 16 April 2017, the new system commenced full-day testing on Sundays for two months. The new C151B rolling stock were first introduced to the line on these testing days. Since 28 May 2017, the new signalling system has been operating full-day on the North-South Line. The old signalling system then ceased operations on 2 January 2019.

Platform screen doors

When the line was first opened, full-height platform screen doors supplied by Westinghouse were installed at underground stations. These doors serve to prevent suicides, enable climate control within the station, better security control by restricting access to the tunnels and tracks and for overall passenger safety considerations. The authorities initially rejected calls for platform screen doors to be installed at elevated stations by casting doubts over functionality and concerns about the high installation costs. Nevertheless, the LTA reversed its decision and made plans to install half-height platform screen doors on elevated stations on 25 January 2008. The first platform screen doors by ST Electronics were installed at Pasir Ris, Jurong East and Yishun stations in 2009 as trial runs. Subsequently, installation began in May 2011 at Ang Mo Kio station. On 14 March 2012, platform screen doors became operational at all elevated stations on the North-South Line.

Rail
The NSL was built with wooden sleepers, which needed to be replaced when they neared the end of their lifespan of 15 to 25 years. The replacement sleepers, made out of concrete, have a significantly longer lifespan and enable smoother and safer rides. Since 2014, train services on the line have ended earlier for critical maintenance works, with the exception of a break between September 2016 and December 2017.

Trains on the NSL are powered via a third rail. However, constant contact between the train's Current Collector Devices (CCD) and the line saw the need for replacement works on the third rail, which were completed in August 2017. The new third rail replaced its 30-year-old predecessor, which was used since the opening of the line. The new electrical system is expected to make train services more reliable.

References

External links
 North South Line

Mass Rapid Transit (Singapore) lines
Railway lines opened in 1987
1987 establishments in Singapore